The Folsom House is a historic house museum at 272 West Government Street in Taylors Falls, Minnesota, United States.

Description and history 
It is the restored former home of lumber magnate W.H.C. Folsom, who moved his family to the area in 1850. Folsom served as state representative for one term and state senator for six terms. The house is run by a partnership between the Taylors Falls Historical Society and the Minnesota Historical Society. It is in the Angel Hill District of Taylors Falls, a New England-style village. The home is furnished with the family's original belongings, including a Hews rectangular grand piano, Folsom's library, and other personal effects.

The house is one of two notable former Folsom properties. In Prairie du Chien, Wisconsin, the W.H.C. Folsom House is listed on the National Register of Historic Places.

References

External links
 
 Folsom House  - Taylors Falls Historical Society
 Folsom House - Minnesota Historical Society

Historic district contributing properties in Minnesota
Historic house museums in Minnesota
Houses on the National Register of Historic Places in Minnesota
Minnesota Historical Society
Museums in Chisago County, Minnesota
Houses in Chisago County, Minnesota
National Register of Historic Places in Chisago County, Minnesota
Greek Revival houses in Minnesota